Battery cages are a housing system used for various animal production methods, but primarily for egg-laying hens.  The name arises from the arrangement of rows and columns of identical cages connected, in a unit, as in an artillery battery. Although the term is usually applied to poultry farming, similar cage systems are used for other animals. Battery cages have generated controversy between advocates for animal welfare and industrial producers.

Battery cages in practice  

Robotic cages are the predominant form of housing for laying hens worldwide. They reduce aggression and cannibalism among hens, but are barren, restrict movement, prevent many natural behaviours, and increase rates of osteoporosis. As of 2014, approximately 95 percent of eggs in the United States were produced in battery cages. In the United Kingdom, statistics from the Department for Environment, Food and Rural Affairs (DEFRA) indicate that 50% of eggs produced in the UK throughout 2010 were from cages (45% from free-range, 5% from barns).

The EU ban on battery-caged hens 

The Council of the European Union Directive 1999/74/EC banned conventional battery cages in the EU starting in January 2012 for welfare reasons. This has led to a significant decrease in the number of eggs from battery cages in the EU. The 2012 battery cage ban was publicised as heralding an end to caged hens throughout Europe, but it created a widely held misconception that all laying hens in the UK are now either free-range or barn birds. That is not the case; although battery cages are illegal, farmers have skirted the ban by providing slightly bigger cages with "enrichment" such as perches. The hens in these conditions are now called "ex-cage colony hens".

Other examples of caged animals

Battery cages are also used for mink, rabbit, chinchilla and fox in fur farming, and most recently for the Asian palm civet for kopi luwak production of coffee.

History  

An early reference to battery cages appears in Milton Arndt's 1931 book, Battery Brooding, where he reports that his cage flock was healthier and had higher egg production than his conventional flock. At this early date, battery cages already had the sloped floor that allowed eggs to roll to the front of the cage, where they were easily collected by the farmer and out of the hens' reach. Arndt also mentions the use of conveyor belts under the cages to remove manure, which provides better air control quality and reduces fly breeding.

Original battery cages extended the technology used in battery brooders, which were cages with a wire mesh floor and integral heating elements for brooding chicks. The wire floor allowed the manure to pass through, removing it from the chicks' environment and reducing the risk of manure-borne diseases.

Early battery cages were often used for selecting hens based on performance since it is easy to track how many eggs each hen is laying if only one hen is placed in a cage. Later, this was combined with artificial insemination, giving a technique where each egg's parentage is known. This method is still used today.

Early reports from Arndt about battery cages were enthusiastic. Arndt reported:

In 1967, Samuel Duff filed a patent for "battery cages" in patent US3465722.

The use of laying batteries increased gradually, becoming the dominant method somewhat before the integration of the egg industry in the 1960s. The practice of battery cages was criticized in Ruth Harrison's landmark book Animal Machines, published in 1964.

In 1990, North and Bell reported that 75 percent of all commercial layers in the world and 95 percent in the United States were kept in cages.

By all accounts, a caged layer facility is more expensive to build than high-density floor confinement but can be cheaper to operate if designed to minimize labor.

North and Bell report the following economic advantages to laying cages:

 It is easier to care for the pullets; no birds are underfoot
 Floor eggs are eliminated
 Eggs are cleaner
 Culling is expedited
 In most instances, less feed is required to produce a dozen eggs
 Broodiness is eliminated
 More pullets may be housed in a given house floor space
 Internal parasites are eliminated
 Labor requirements are generally much reduced

They also cite disadvantages to cages:

 The handling of manure may be a problem
 Generally, flies become a greater nuisance
 The investment per pullet may be higher than in the case of floor operations
 There is a slightly higher percentage of blood spots in the eggs
 The bones are more fragile and processors often discount the fowl price

Disadvantages one and two can be eliminated by manure conveyors, but some industrial systems do not feature manure conveyors.

Legislation 

Efforts are being undertaken to prohibit battery cages in countries around the world, including Bhutan, India, Brazil, Costa Rica, and Mexico.

Australia  

Attempts to change the law have been an object of contention; RSPCA Australia has been officially campaigning to abolish both battery cages and furnished cages and to prohibit the sale of cage eggs ever since the 2001 revision of the Poultry Code. The 2009 Code of Practice permits the use of battery cages. A written commitment by the Federal government to review the practice was scheduled in 2010; there was no further communication. During 2013 the state government of Tasmania was planning to phase out battery cages and budgeting for financial compensation for affected farmers but this was scrapped following the 2014 election. 

The Australian Capital Territory prohibited battery cages in early 2014. The Greens were committed to also legally prohibit them in late 2014 in Victoria. In 2019, New South Wales Legislative Council member Emma Hurst established and chaired a NSW Parliamentary Inquiry into the Use of Battery Cages for Hens in the Egg Production Industry. The Inquiry recommended that all food products containing eggs from caged hens should be clearly labelled for the benefit of consumers, and a phase-out of battery cage hen farming in NSW.

Bhutan 

Bhutan outlawed battery cages in 2012.

Canada 

In February 2016, 90 percent of egg-laying hens in Canada lived in battery cages. That month, negotiations between egg farmers, animal welfarists, and the government resulted in a moratorium on construction of new battery cages from 1 April 2017 and a gradual 15-year phaseout of battery cages towards enriched cage or cage-free systems by 2036. Activist group Mercy for Animals was pleased with the announced phaseout, but called the timetable "simply outrageous" and argued that more urgency was required; some food companies such as Cara Foods, Tim Hortons, Burger King, McDonald's, Wendy's, Starbucks, and Subway restaurant announced they would phaseout non-cage-free eggs much sooner than 2036.

European Union 

In 1999, the Council of the European Union Directive 1999/74/EC banned the conventional battery cage in the EU in 2012, after a 12-year phase-out. In their 1996 report, the European Commission's Scientific Veterinary Committee (SVC) condemned the battery cage, concluding:

The EU Directive allows "enriched" or "furnished" cages to be used. The cage must also contain litter, perches, and "claw-shortening devices". Some animal welfare organisations, such as Compassion in World Farming, have criticised this move, calling for enriched cages to be prohibited as they believe they provide no significant or worthwhile welfare benefits compared with conventional battery cages.

Germany banned conventional battery cages in 2007, five years earlier than required by the EU Directive, and has prohibited enriched cages from 2012. Mahi Klosterhalfen of the Albert Schweitzer Foundation has been instrumental in a strategic campaign against battery cages in Germany.

India 

In 2013, the Animal Welfare Board of India concluded that battery cages were in violation of Section 11 (1)(e) of the 1960 Prevention of Cruelty to Animals Act, and issued an advisory to all state governments stating that battery cages should not be used and existing ones should be phased out by 2017. This interpretation has been followed by several states and confirmed by several courts such as the Punjab and Haryana High Court (March 2014) and the Delhi High Court. Yet, some battery cages have been found to continue operating illegally after 1 January 2017.

New Zealand 

On 7 December 2012, as part of a new welfare code for the poultry industry, the New Zealand government implemented a ban on the construction of new battery cages and initiated a ten-year phase-out of all battery cages in the country by 2022. As an intermediate goal, 45 percent of battery cages were to be removed by 2018.

Norway 

In April 2010, the Norwegian grocery chain REMA 1000 decided to stop selling eggs from both battery and furnished cage hens by the year 2012, to coincide with the scheduled EU-wide prohibition on battery cages. Norwegian law followed EU legislation and on 1 January 2012 also prohibited battery cages (known as tradisjonelle bur or "traditional cages" in Norwegian), making furnished cages (known as miljøbur or "environmental cages" in Norwegian) the minimum legal requirement. Several more industry groups have decided to voluntarily phase out furnished cages as well, such as NorgesGruppen by 2019 and Nortura by 2024, while in April 2017 the Green Party proposed to ban furnished cages throughout the country by 2025.

Switzerland  

Switzerland banned battery cages from 1 January 1992; it was the first country to impose such a ban.

United States 

As of March 2020, California, Massachusetts, Washington, Michigan, Ohio, and Rhode Island had passed laws banning the use of battery cages, and the former three additionally banned the sale of eggs produced in battery cages. Michigan's ban of battery cages and the sale of non-cage-free eggs in the state, adopted in November 2019, will enter into force at the end of 2024.

The passage of California Proposition 2 in 2008 aimed, in part, to reduce or eliminate the problems associated with battery cages, by setting the standard for space relative to free movement and wingspan, rather than cage size.

Battery cages are illegal in Michigan due to HB 5127, passed in 2009, which mandates that certain farm animals have enough room to stand up, lie down, turn around, and extend their limbs, rather than being confined in tiny cages.

In Ohio, there is a moratorium on permits for the construction of new battery cages as of June 2010.

Oregon SB 805 also banned battery cages and set forth a transition to enriched colony cages, doubling the space per egg-laying hen. This law served as the model for a national agreement between the Humane Society of the United States and the United Egg Producers.

Welfare concerns  

There are several welfare concerns regarding the battery cage system of housing and husbandry.  These are presented below in the approximate chronological order they would influence the hens.

Chick culling 

Due to modern selective breeding, laying hen strains are different from those of meat production strains. Male birds of the laying strains do not lay eggs and are unsuitable for meat production, therefore, they are culled soon after being sexed, often on the day of hatching. Methods of culling include cervical dislocation, asphyxiation by carbon dioxide and maceration using a high speed grinder.

Animal rights groups have used videos of live chicks being placed into macerators as evidence of cruelty in the egg production industry. Maceration, together with cervical dislocation and asphyxiation by carbon dioxide, are all considered acceptable methods of euthanasia by the American Veterinary Medical Association. Consumers may also be appalled simply by the death of animals that are not subsequently eaten.

Beak-trimming 

To reduce the harmful effects of feather pecking, cannibalism and vent pecking, most chicks eventually going into battery cages are beak-trimmed. This is often performed on the first day after hatching, simultaneously with sexing and receiving vaccinations.  Beak-trimming is a procedure considered by many scientists to cause acute pain and distress with possible chronic pain; it is practised on chicks for all types of housing systems, not only battery cages.

Cage size  

At approximately 16 weeks of age, pullets (hens which have not yet started to lay) are placed into cages. The space available to each hen in a battery cage has often been described as less than the size of a sheet of A4 paper. Other people have commented that a typical cage is about the size of a filing cabinet drawer and holds eight to ten hens.

Behavioural studies showed that when turning, hens used , when stretching wings , when wing flapping , when feather ruffling , when preening , and when ground scratching 540 to 1005 cm2. A space allowance of  would prevent hens in battery cages from performing these behaviours without touching another hen.  Animal welfare scientists have been critical of battery cages because of these space restrictions and it is widely considered that hens suffer boredom and frustration when unable to perform these behaviours. Spatial restriction can lead to a wide range of abnormal behaviours, some of which are injurious to the hens or their cagemates.

Light manipulation 

To reduce the harmful effects of feather pecking, cannibalism and vent-pecking, hens in battery cages (and other housing systems) are often kept at low light intensities (e.g. less than ten lux). Low light intensities may be associated with welfare costs to the hens as they prefer to eat in brightly lit environments and prefer brightly lit areas for active behaviour but dim (less than ten lux) for inactive behaviour.  Dimming the lights can also cause problems when the intensity is then abruptly increased temporarily to inspect the hens; this has been associated as a risk factor of increased feather pecking and the birds can become frightened resulting in panic-type ("hysteria") reactions which can increase the risk of injury.

Being indoors, hens in battery cages do not see sunlight. Whilst there is no scientific evidence for this being a welfare problem, some animal advocates indicate it is a concern.  Furnished cages and some other non-cage indoor systems would also prevent hens seeing natural light throughout their lives.

Osteoporosis  

Several studies have indicated that toward the end of the laying phase (approximately 72 weeks of age), a combination of high calcium demand for egg production and a lack of exercise can lead to osteoporosis. This can occur in all housing systems for egg laying hens, but is particularly prevalent in battery cage systems where it has sometimes been called 'cage layer osteoporosis'. Osteoporosis leads to the skeleton becoming fragile and an increased risk of bone breakage, particularly in the legs and keel bone. Fractures may occur whilst the hens are in the cage and these are usually discovered at depopulation as old, healed breaks, or they might be fresh breaks which occurred during the process of depopulation. One study showed that 24.6 percent of hens from battery cages had recent keel fractures whereas hens in furnished cages, barn and free range had 3.6 percent, 1.2 percent and 1.3 percent respectively. However, hens from battery cages experienced fewer old breaks (17.7%) compared to hens in  barn (69.1%), free-range (59.8%) and furnished cages (31.7%).

Forced moulting 

Flocks are sometimes force moulted, rather than being slaughtered, to reinvigorate egg-laying.  This involves complete withdrawal of food (and sometimes water) for seven to fourteen days or sufficiently long to cause a body weight loss of 25 to 35 percent. This stimulates the hen to lose her feathers, but also reinvigorates egg-production.  Some flocks may be force moulted several times. In 2003, more than 75 percent of all flocks were moulted in the US. This temporary starving of the hens is seen as inhumane and is the main point of objection by critics and opponents of the practice. The alternative most often employed is to slaughter the hens instead of moulting them.

Improving welfare for egg-producing hens  

The Scientific Veterinary Committee of the European Commission stated that "enriched cages and well-designed non-cage systems have already been shown to have a number of welfare advantages over battery systems in their present form". Supporters of battery husbandry contend that alternative systems such as free range also have welfare problems, such as increases in cannibalism, feather pecking and vent pecking.  A recent review of welfare in battery cages made the point that such welfare issues are problems of management, unlike the issues of behavioural deprivation, which are inherent in a system that keeps hens in such cramped and barren conditions.  Free-range egg producers can limit or eliminate injurious pecking, particularly feather pecking, through such strategies as providing environmental enrichment, feeding mash instead of pellets, keeping roosters in with the hens, and arranging nest boxes so hens are not exposed to each other's vents; similar strategies are more restricted or impossible in battery cages.

See also 

 Animal rights
 Animal welfare
 Open rescue

References

External links  

 The Battery Hen Welfare Trust
 Compassion in World Farming - Egg laying hens
  from  
 EU battery cage ban

Articles containing video clips
Buildings and structures used to confine animals
Cruelty to animals
Ethically disputed business practices towards animals
Poultry farming